Gustave William Buchen (September 25, 1886 – December 3, 1951) was an American politician, educator, and lawyer.

Early life and education 
Born in the town of Lyndon in Sheboygan County, Wisconsin, Buchen received his bachelor's degree from the University of Wisconsin–Madison in 1909 and his law degree from the University of Wisconsin Law School in 1912.

Career 
From 1909 to 1911, he taught rhetoric and oratory at University of Oregon and public speaking at the University of Wisconsin–Madison in 1911 and 1912. He practiced law in Sheboygan, Wisconsin. He served as a member of the Wisconsin Senate from 1942 to 1951 when he died while still in office. He was a delegate to the 1936 Republican National Convention.

Personal life 
Buchen's son, Philip W. Buchen also practiced law and became White House counsel during the presidency of Gerald Ford.

References

1886 births
1951 deaths
People from Lyndon, Sheboygan County, Wisconsin
University of Wisconsin–Madison alumni
University of Wisconsin Law School alumni
University of Wisconsin–Madison faculty
University of Oregon faculty
Wisconsin lawyers
Republican Party Wisconsin state senators
20th-century American politicians
20th-century American lawyers